The Joint Strike Missile (JSM) is a multi-role, air-launched cruise missile under development by the Norwegian company Kongsberg Defence & Aerospace (KDA) and American company Raytheon Missiles & Defense. The JSM is derived from the Naval Strike Missile.

Development
A development of the Naval Strike Missile (NSM), the Joint Strike Missile (JSM) will feature an option for ground strike and a two-way communications line, so that the missile can communicate with the central control room or other missiles in the air. This missile will be integrated with the Lockheed Martin F-35 Lightning II. Studies have shown that the F-35 would be able to carry two of these in its internal bays, while four additional missiles could be carried externally.

Lockheed Martin and Kongsberg signed a joint-marketing agreement for this air-launched version of the NSM, as well as an agreement committing both parties to integrating the JSM on the F-35 platform. The project is funded by Norway and Australia. Kongsberg signed a contract for the first phase of development of the JSM in April, 2009, which is scheduled for completion within 18 months. The JSM will have multicore computers running Integrity real-time operating system from Green Hills Software.

Improved features for the Joint Strike Missile include:
 Larger warhead.
 Shape changed to fit in F-35 internal bay
 Ability to attack sea and land based targets
 Aerial launch platform (F-35)
 Improved range over NSM, estimates include  to >100 nmi low-low or >  hi-low flight profiles
 Long-term, production start in 2023

In November 2015, an F-16 Falcon successfully completed live-fire testing of the JSM at the Utah Test and Training Range.

Other variants
Kongsberg were studying methods to deploy the JSM from Norway's submarines, and found shaping the missile to fit into the F-35's confined bomb-bay also enabled it to fit in the Mark 41 Vertical Launching System. A VL-JSM could also compete with the Lockheed LRASM for the U.S. Navy's OASuW Increment 2 for a ship-launched anti-ship missile.

Operators
On 15 July 2014, Kongsberg and Raytheon announced that they had formed a teaming agreement to offer the JSM to the United States Navy for their Offensive Anti-Surface Warfare (OASuW) requirement; Raytheon would produce JSMs for the American market. The Navy plans to begin a competition for the OASuW requirement in 2017, which will likely pit the Kongsberg/Raytheon JSM against the Lockheed Martin Long Range Anti-Ship Missile (LRASM).

The Royal Norwegian Air Force ordered JSM to their fleet of F-35 fighters in October 2021. Expected delivery to be in 2023. Integration of the JSM with the F-35, and testing in the United States is facilitated by Lone Star Analysis, under long term contract with the Norwegian Ministry of Defense.

In March 2019, Kongsberg was awarded a contract to supply the Japan Air Self-Defense Force with initial deliveries of the joint strike missile.

The missiles are expected to arrive in April 2021.

In December 2021 Finland selected F-35 as their future fighter jet, and have selected JSM among other weaponry.

In the Department of Defense's FY 2024 budget request, the United States Air Force intends to procure 268 JSMs over a five year period with the initial order of 48 missiles for FY2024.

Potential operators

Australia expressed interest in buying the JSM in June 2014 to equip their F-35 fighters. The missile has also been pitched to South Korea and Japan, and Kongsberg is expected to attempt to make sales to other countries that have ordered the F-35A.  The JSM is expected to become fully operational in 2025. Development is aimed to be completed in 2017 and achievement of initial operational capability (IOC) is expected in 2021 with the release of the F-35's Block 4 software.  Fit checks have been performed on the external hardpoints of all F-35 variants, and internally on the F-35A and C-models.  Countries that operate other aircraft have expressed interest in the JSM, and fit checks have also been performed on the F-15 Eagle and F/A-18 Hornet, but integration on other platforms will not be conducted without a confirmed customer.

On 15 September 2015 the Australian government signed an agreement to finance the development of a passive radio frequency seeker to complement the existing infrared target seeker.

See also
 AGM-158C LRASM
 Exocet
 Harpoon
 Sea Eagle
 Sea Killer

References

External links 

Official NSM product page at KDA
Official JSM product page at KDA
Defpro.com:Norway conducted very successful NSM test firing (Febr 2009)
Missile.index search – Choose Development-Country: "Norway", then click "Search", then pick "NSM" from the results list (direct linking N/A)
Kongsberg test fires Naval Strike Missiles – Jane's Navy International, 8 August 2006
Capital Markets Day 2007 Kongsberg Defence & Aerospace

Anti-ship cruise missiles of Norway
Anti-ship missiles of Norway
Kongsberg Gruppen
Surface-to-surface missiles
Military equipment introduced in the 2010s
Anti-ship missiles of the United States